Penton Hook Marina is the largest inland marina in Britain. It is on the reach above Chertsey Lock and opposite Penton Hook Island.

The marina is set in 80 acres of what were previously disused gravel pits. It has approximately 600 berths. The marina is downstream from Runnymede where King John signed Magna Carta.

References

Marinas in England
Geography of the River Thames